Hooke Baronetcy was a title in the Baronetage of England of Flanchford in the Surrey.

Hooke baronets, of Flanchford
Sir Thomas Hooke, 1st Baronet (1641–1678)
Sir Hele Hooke, 2nd Baronet (–1712)

References

Extinct baronetcies in the Baronetage of England